The Charlotte 49ers women's basketball team represents University of North Carolina at Charlotte in women's basketball. The school competes in the Conference USA in Division I of the National Collegiate Athletic Association (NCAA). The 49ers play home basketball games at Halton Arena in Charlotte, North Carolina.

History
As of the end of the 2015–16 season (their 41st), they have an all-time record of 653–506. They have won five conference titles, winning them in 1990 (Sun Belt), 2003 (C-USA), 2006 (Atlantic-10), 2009 (Atlantic 10), and 2022 (Conference USA).

They played in the Sun Belt Conference from 1984 to 1991, the Metro Conference from 1991 to 1995, Conference USA from 1995–2005, 2013–present, and the Atlantic 10 Conference from 2006–2013.

NCAA tournament results
The 49ers have appeared in three NCAA Tournaments, with a combined record of 0–3.

References

External links